We Versus the Shark is an American math rock band from Athens, Georgia, United States. The band formed in March 2003, and is composed of several multi-instrumentalists who change instruments and all sing during live shows. Their debut full-length, Ruin Everything!, was released in January 2005 on the label Hello Sir. An EP followed in 2007. The band released the album "Dirty Versions" on November 17, 2008. The band also released an album of cover songs on Quote Unquote Records featuring songs by bands as diverse as Tom Waits, Tears for Fears, The Matt Kurz One, and Television.  On March 23rd, 2020, the band announced its return and released a new single, Righteous Vibes, the next day.

Members
Luke Douglas Fields - guitar, keyboards, vocals
Jeffrey Daniel Tobias - bass, keyboards, vocals
Scott Philip Smith - drums
Samantha Erin Paulsen - guitar, keyboards, vocals

Discography
Split EP with Cinemechanica and Maserati (Hello Sir, 2004)
Ruin Everything! (Hello Sir, 2005)
EP of Bees EP (Hello Sir, 2007)
Dirty Versions (Hello Sir, 2008)
Murmurmur (Quote Unquote Records, 2008) 
 Goodbye Guitar (Ernest Jenning Record Co., 2020)

References

Rock music groups from Georgia (U.S. state)
Math rock groups
Musical groups established in 2003
Musical groups disestablished in 2009
Musical groups from Athens, Georgia